Madagasikara Airways was an airline based in Madagascar. It operated domestic and international scheduled and charter flights.

Destinations 

Madagasikara Airways operates to the following destinations:

Fleet

Current fleet
As of August 2019 Madagasikara Airways operates the following aircraft:

Former fleet
In 2017 Madagasikara Airways operated Embraer EMB 120 Brasilia aircraft.

References

Airlines of Madagascar